Monokuro Boo are anime-style characters that were created by the Japanese company San-X. The characters are composed of two pigs, one white and one black, with square-shaped bodies, dots for eyes, a snout and a curly tail at the back. They are also occasionally seen with a bee flying around them. The black pig name is Monokuro, while the white pig name is Boo. They are genderless. Their earliest appearances date back to various licensing and gift shows in Japan in 2005.

Monokuro Boo's tagline is "Simple is Best", and one or both of the pigs can also be seen with speech bubbles that say, "Boo", "Love?", "Enjoy?", or "Happy".

The character is licensed under RM Enterprises (BVI) Ltd., who takes care of the development and promotion of the character in Asia, as well as other international territories.

Character Concept and Name 
When these characters were first created, the name was not "Monokuro Boo", it was "Monotone," with "mono" coming from "monochrome" and "ton," a word for pig. This pun is what originally inspired the designer to create black and white pig characters. The designer deliberately bucked the then-current trend for colorful goods for a monotone palette, hoping to create a fun and unique style. By introducing a line of merchandise that exclusively featured black, white and gray, the designer hoped to prove that it is possible for such a concept to be accepted and entertained by the general public, consumers and fans of kawaii merchandise in general.

In line with the character's concept, the name "Monokuro Boo" is also a derivation of the words "Monokuro" ("Monochrome") and "Boo" (the Japanese onomatopoeic equivalent for "oink").

Baby Boo 
Despite Monokuro Boo's statement that kawaii does not always have to be colorful, San-X has also created a spin-off line of products which features smaller, pastel or candy-colored pigs known as Baby Boo. Baby Boo consists of seven pigs who are named and colored as follows:

Berry – pastel red
Peach – pastel pink
Orange – pastel orange
Lemon – pastel yellow
Mint – pastel green
Soda – pastel blue
Grape – pastel purple/lavender

Baby Boo's tagline is "Are you happy?" ("anata wa shiawase?") and "So Happy With You*" ("anata to iru to tottemo tanoshī*"). As with Monokuro Boo, a bee-like insect is also seen hovering near the Baby Boo, except the bee is made to look like a strawberry (or ladybug). Some of the Baby Boos also say, "Poo".

References

External links
Monokuro Boo official San-X site
Baby Boo official San-X page
Online Retailer of Monokuro Boo

Fictional pigs
San-X characters